Goldfields Highway is a generally northwest–southeast highway in central Western Australia which links the Great Northern Highway at Meekatharra with Coolgardie-Esperance Highway south of Kalgoorlie.

A large  section of the highway, from Meekatharra to Wiluna, is not a sealed road . A project to upgrade Goldfields Highway by sealing this portion, over a three-year period, was scheduled to start in the 2017/18 financial year with $60 million of funding through Royalties for Regions. As of 2020, a small  section is being sealed.

See also

 Highways in Australia
 List of highways in Western Australia

References

Highways in rural Western Australia
Goldfields-Esperance